The Nomads are a Swedish garage punk band founded in 1981 by Hans Östlund, Nick Vahlberg, Joakim Tärnström, and Ed Johnson. Today, Östlund and Vahlberg are the only members left of the original line-up.

The band plays music influenced by the MC5, The Stooges, Roky Erickson, The Cramps, The Ramones, New York Dolls, and other early garage rock and punk bands. The Nomads have been an influential band in the Scandinavian garage rock and punk scenes, inspiring bands such as The Hives, Hellacopters, "Demons", Gluecifer, and many others.

Career
After releasing a number of records in the 1980s the band toured extensively and built a large fanbase without any significant rotation on either radio or television. During the years, touring and recording have decreased but The Nomads still play a number of shows every year in the Scandinavian region. In 2001 the band celebrated their 20th anniversary with a gig in Stockholm that included appearances by members from Bob Hund, Sator, The Flaming Sideburns, Robert Johnson and Punchdrunks, as well as members of the original line-up. At their gig at the Hultsfred festival the band once again took the opportunity to celebrate with guest appearances from Nick Royale, Chips Kiesbye Handsome Dick Manitoba, Ross The Boss, Jello Biafra, Chris Bailey, Odd Ahlgren, and Wayne Kramer. 20 Years Too Soon - A Tribute To The Nomads was released in 2003 with bands like The Hellacopters, Electric Frankenstein, The Dictators, The Robots, Bob Hund, and Nitwitz contributing with their own version of their favorite Nomads songs. In 2008 The Nomads shared the stage with Roky Erickson at the Peace and Love festival in Sweden.

Discography

Albums
Where the Wolf Bane Blooms - 1983
Temptation Pays Double - 1984
Outburst 1984
Rat Fink a Boo-Boo - 1987
Hardware - 1987
All Wrecked Up - 1989
Sonically Speaking . 1991
Powerstrip - 1994
Showdown! - 1994
Flashback Number Nine - 1995
Made in Japan (Recorded in Sweden) - 1996
Raw & Rare . 1996
The Cold Hard Facts of Life - 1996
Big Sound 2000 - 1999
Up-Tight - 2001
Showdown 2-The 90's - 2002
Nomadic Dementia - 2006
Solna - 2012
Demolición! Live At El Sol, Madrid - 2015

Singles
Psycho/Come See Me - 1981
Night Time/Boss Hoss - 1982
Showdown - 1984
She Pays The Rent/Nitroglycerine Shrieks - 1985
E.S.P./Driving Sideways On A One Way Street - 1985
Rockin' All Through The Night - 1986
This Ain't The Summer Of Love/Out Of The Frying Pan, Into The Fire - 1986 (as The Screamin' Dizbusters)
16 Forever/Salvation By Damnation - 1987
The Next Big Thing/He's Waiting - 1988 (as The Screamin' Dizbusters)
Where The Wolf Bane Blooms/Rat Fink A Boo-Boo - 1987
Fire And Brimstone/Beyond The Valley Of The Dolls - 1989
My Deadly Game/I Have Always Been Here Before - 1989
Red Temple Prayer - 1991
Chinese Rocks - 1991
Can't Keep My Mind Off You/Wasn't Born To Work - 1991
Smooth/Showing Pictures To The Blind/Call Off Your Dogs - 1991 (CD Re-issue)
Can't Keep My Mind Off You/Wasn't Born To Work - 1991 (CD Re-issue)
Estrus Gearbox - 1992
Primordial Ooze/Showing Pictures To The Blind/I’m Branded - 1992
Wimp/I Remember - 1993
Magdalena 93 - 1993
Wasn't Born To Work/A Certain Girl/Rat Fink A Boo-Boo - 1993
(I'm) Out Of It/Fan Club - 1994
Kinda Crime/Dig Up the Hatchet - 1994 (CD Re-issue)
Blind Spot/(I'm) Out Of It - 1994 (CD Re-issue)
Dig Up The Hatchet/The Goodbye Look - 1995
Wimp (live) - 1995
Iron Dream/Edvin Medvind - 1996
Kinda Crime - 1996
Pack of Lies/Graveyard - 1997
Love's Gone Bad/Leaving Here - 1997
16 Forever (live)(split w/ Dictators) - 1997
I’m Gone/Ain’t Yet Dead - 1999
She’ll Always Be Mine/I’m Out Of It/I’ve Seen Better - 1999
Trucker Speed - 1999
The King Of Nighttrain/Top Alcohol - 2000
The King Of Nighttrain/Top Alcohol - 2000 (CD Re-issue)
Crystal Ball/Mirrors - 2001
Crystal Ball/Mirrors - 2001 (CD -Re-issue)
 In A House Of Cards/Think Of As One - 2002
Ain't No King Of Rock'n'Roll - 2006
Miles Away/Something Else, Something New - 2012
Better Off Dead (live), Wasn't Born To Work (live) - 2016 (split 7-inch with Sator)

References

External links
 Official website
 Official MySpace

Garage punk groups
Swedish punk rock groups
Musical groups established in 1981